Kyle Morgan Richardson (born 13 May 1987) is a freestyle swimmer from Australia.  He competed for Australia at the 2010 Commonwealth Games, winning gold in two relay events. Today Kyle Richardson is a Brisbane wedding photographer based in Brisbane, Australia.

References

1987 births
Living people
Australian male freestyle swimmers
Swimmers at the 2010 Commonwealth Games
Commonwealth Games gold medallists for Australia
World Aquatics Championships medalists in swimming
Medalists at the FINA World Swimming Championships (25 m)
Commonwealth Games medallists in swimming
Swimmers from Brisbane
Sportsmen from Queensland
Medallists at the 2010 Commonwealth Games